William (Bill) G. Doerner (born 1949) is a professor in the College of Criminology and Criminal Justice at Florida State University.  

His research has covered topics such as criminal justice, delinquency, law enforcement, police management and procedures, and victimology.

Biography
Doerner was born in Bridgeport, Connecticut.  He graduated from Fairfield University (in Fairfield, Connecticut) with a B.A. in Sociology in 1971.  Continuing directly into graduate studies, he received his M.A. from Emory University (in Atlanta, Georgia) two years later and his Ph.D. in Sociology from the University of Tennessee (in Knoxville, Tennessee) in 1977.  While working on his dissertation, he taught and conducted research at Marquette University (in Milwaukee, Wisconsin).  Upon completion of his doctoral studies, he accepted a position in the College of Criminology & Criminal Justice at Florida State University where he currently teaches courses to undergraduate and graduate students.

Several years after beginning as an assistant professorship, a neighbor invited him to ride along with county sheriff deputies.  In 1980, he began working as a part-time reserve officer with the Tallahassee Police Department.  Besides serving as a one-person patrol unit, he lectured at the state established Pat Thomas Law Enforcement Academy, evaluated police training programs, and provided in-service training to dispatchers and veteran officers.  In the 1990s, he conducted a police training seminar for the National Police Academy in Costa Rica that was sponsored by the Universidad de Costa Rica and the Florida/Costa Rica (FLORICA ) Linkage Institute.  Doerner retired from policing in 2010.

Throughout his academic career, Doerner has drawn on his practical experiences in law enforcement to write several textbooks and over sixty journal articles, book chapters, reviews, and monographs.  He has served as editor for the American Journal of Criminal Justice and on the board of directors for the Southern Criminal Justice Association.  In 2009, he was recognized for "significant contributions to the field of victimology and victim services" by the American Society of Victimology.

Selected publications
Text Books
 
 
 
 
 

Journal Articles

References

External links
 Florida State University faculty profile 

1949 births
Living people
Writers from Bridgeport, Connecticut
American criminologists
American textbook writers
American male non-fiction writers
Fairfield University alumni
Emory University alumni
University of Tennessee alumni
Florida State University faculty